The Blenheim Horse Trials is an annual international three-day event held in the park of Blenheim Palace, at Woodstock, England. It is rated CCI*** (the second highest level of eventing).

Blenheim began in 1990, after the three-day event held at Chatsworth was ended. The venue has since become popular both for national and international events, beginning in 1994 with the FEI European Young Rider Championships.

In 2003, Blenheim hosted the Asia-Pacific Championships as a qualifier for the 2004 Athens Olympics. Sixteen nations were represented and several European, World, and Olympic Champions competed. The winner, Pippa Funnell, became the first rider to win three times at the venue. Pippa Funnell won yet again at the 2004 Blenheim Horse Trials, on her stallion, Viceroy.

In 2005, Blenheim hosted the European Eventing Championship.

Blenheim also hosts an 8 and 9 year old CIC*** class, which now incorporates the British 8 and 9 year old National Championship.

A world class international equestrian event and a great day out with family and friends! There is much to do on all days in addition to the showcase eventing classes, such as complimentary displays and demonstrations, competitions for grassroots riders, a fun ride and of course a plethora of shops, food outlets, bars and entertainments, all within the magnificent grounds of Blenheim Palace.

For the first time in 2021, the event will be organised by The Jockey Club, the body that runs the Cheltenham Festival, the Epsom Derby and the Aintree Grand National.

Past Winners of Blenheim

1990 Lucinda Murray (now Lucinda Fredericks)/Just Jeremy (GBR)
1991 Andrew Nicholson/Park Grove (NZL)
1992 Rodney Powell/Limmy’s Comet (GBR)
1993 Pippa Nolan (now Mrs Funnell)/Metronome (GBR)
1994 Bruce Davidson/Squelch (USA)
Young Rider European Champion: Nina Melkonian/Westphalia/GER
Young Rider European Championships Team: GBR
1995 Pippa Funnell/Bits And Pieces (GBR)
1996 Mary King/King Solomon lll (GBR)
1997 Paddy Muir/Archie Brown (GBR)
1998 Polly Clark (now Polly Stockton)/Westlord (GBR)
1999 Franck Bourny/Mallard’s Treat (FRA)
2000 William Fox-Pitt/Stunning (also 2nd on Tamarillo (horse)) (GBR)
2001 Kimberly Vinoski (now Ms Severson)/Winsome Adante (USA)
2002 Lucinda Fredericks/Headley Britannia (AUS)
2003 Pippa Funnell/Jurassic Rising (GBR) (also 3rd on Viceroy ll)
Asia-Pacific Champion: Phillip Dutton/Nova Top (AUS)
Asia-Pacific Winning Team: Australia
2004 Pippa Funnell/Viceroy II
2005 European Eventing Championships
Zara Phillips and Toytown (GBR) Individual Gold
Great Britain Team Gold
2006 Daisy Dick (Now Daisy Berkeley)/Springbok IV
2007 Chris King/The Secret Weapon
2008 Cancelled after dressage phase due to poor weather
2009 Lucy Wiegersma/Granntevka Prince
2010 William Fox-Pitt/Parklane Hawk
2011 Piggy French/DHI Topper W
2012 William Fox-Pitt/Seacookie
2013 William Fox-Pitt/Stormseason
2014 Francis Whittington/Easy Target
2015 Clark Montgomery (USA) on Mr & Mrs W. Becker's Loughan Glen
2016 Bettina Hoy (GER) on her own Seigneur Medicott
2017 Kimberly Severson (USA) on The Cross Syndicate's Cooley Cross Border
2018 Bella Innes Ker Carolyn

External links
 Official Blenheim Horse Trials Website 

Eventing
Equestrian sports in the United Kingdom
Sport in Oxfordshire
Equestrian sports in England